Mykola Stasyuk was a Ukrainian political and public figure from Katerynoslav or its province. He was a member of the first government of Ukraine as its Agriculture Minister and he was a member of the Central Council of Ukraine, prominent cooperator, writer, and memoirist, a chairman of the Ukrainian Peasants Union.

Some sources write his name as Mykola Mykolayovych Stasyuk (Tetyana Ostashko in Handbook on History of Ukraine), others - Mykola Mykhailovych Stasyuk (Mykola Chaban).

Biography
Officially, Mykola Stasyuk was born into a family of serviceman from Yekaterinoslav Governorate. Mykola Chaban, however, found some information about a student Nikolai Mikhailovich Stasyukov at the Saint Petersburg Mining Institute, which is very similar with biography of the Ukrainian minister Mykola Stasyuk.

According to Chaban, Stasyukov was born on 16 May 1885 in Yekaterinoslav. His father nobleman Mikhail Stefanovich Stasyukov was a veterinary doctor. His mother was called Yekaterina Naumovna Konoplia. Both of them were eastern Orthodox Christians. The boy was baptized on 23 May 1885 at Holy Trinity Church in Yekaterinoslav. The date of Stasyuk birth noted at the Petersburg archives was confirmed by the state archives documents of Dnipropetrovsk Oblast where survived metric books for the 1885th year. Mother of Stasyuk was one of the first female doctors in the region, his father owned a brick factory, his uncle worked at administration of the Yekaterina Railways with Adrian Kashchenko.

On 24 August 1894 Stasyuk entered the Katerynoslav realschule from which he graduated on 5 June 1901, finishing a complete course of studies at the school general department. From 18 August 1901 to 5 June 1902 Stasyuk took additional class at the school. Remarkable is that his father also graduated the school 20 years before him. As historical outline of the realschule testifies, Mikhail Stasyukov graduated from the general department in 1882 and in 1883, next year, he finished the additional seventh class of chemistry-technological department.

References

Further reading
 Chaban, M. Wandering of Mykola Stasyuk. "Zoria" newspaper. Dnipropetrovsk 1991.
 Chaban, M. Eternal cross on chest of the earth. "Artistic and documentary essays". Dnipropetrovsk 1993.
 Chaban, M. Spring of our hope. "Borysthen". 1997.
 Verstyuk, V., Ostashko, T. People of the Ukrainian Central Council. "Biographic handbook". Kiev 1998.
 Mazur, P. Prosvita in the occupied Mariupol. "Vilna dumka". Lidcombe 2001.
 Student archives of the Saint Petersburg Mining Institute (Russia).

External links
 Mykola Stasyuk
 Chaban, M. Prominent figure of Central Council - biographical pages of Mykola Stasyuk. "Moloda natsia". 2007.

1885 births
Year of death unknown
Politicians from Dnipro
Saint Petersburg Mining University alumni
Food provision ministers of Ukraine
Nonpersons in the Eastern Bloc
Ukrainian Socialist-Revolutionary Party politicians
Organization of Ukrainian Nationalists politicians
Revolutionary Ukrainian Party politicians
Ukrainian Peasants Union politicians
Members of the Central Council of Ukraine
People who emigrated to escape Bolshevism